Isaac Asimov's Robot City: Suspicion is a book written in 1987 by Mike McQuay. It is part of the series Isaac Asimov's Robot City, which is inspired by Isaac Asimov's Robot series.

Plot summary 
Derec, who has amnesia, and Katherine have been transported to mysterious planet containing an experimental city entirely populated by robots. The only other human that had resided in the city was murdered several days before their arrival, which was by transport using a mysterious device called the Key of Perihelion.  Because they wish to keep secret how they arrived in Robot City, the robots assume either Derec or Katherine committed the murder. Of course, a robot could not do so due to the First Law. Thus, Derec and Katherine must clear their names.

Meanwhile, the city is growing and changed at an alarming rate. Buildings literally change right before their eyes. Derec learns the material the robots and the city itself is made of is the same highly advanced material that the robots of the asteroid he woke up on were made of, therefore connecting the two. The city is also plagued with nightly thunderstorms which produce a tremendous amount of rain. The city's reservoir is about to overflow, which would destroy the city.

While investigating the murder, they find a room at the top of the Compass Tower, the building on which they appeared when using the Key. The room is clearly used by the creator of Robot City to watch over the city without interfering or even being noticed by the rest of the city.  While searching the Central Core's data with a security-free computer terminal in the room Derec secretly learns Katherine's name is an assumed name and is angered at her deceit. He also learns that the Central Core refers to him as David 1 while referring to the dead man as David 2, adding to his theory that none of his experiences since he woke up are merely coincidence.

Derec begins to believe the death of David, the rain, and the city's grown are interconnected. Derec and Katherine decide to split up to speed up their investigations. Derec learns that the mining of building material is causing tremendous amounts of dust and that the building and changing of the city is creating tremendous amounts of heat and water vapor. Together, they are causing the rains, which will soon destroy the city. However, the city has perceived an alien presence and is in a heightened security mode, which is the cause of the rapid growth of the city. Since the presence was registered by the Central Core at the time David was murdered, they must solve the murder and convince it there is no alien presence to get the city to shut down, thus saving it.

Katherine finds the body of David still in the enclosed room formed when he died and has a utility robot cut a hole into it. She goes in to find that David looks exactly like Derec and faints. When she wakes back in their quarters she complains of a headache, but is willing to return to the body's location with Derec.  When they arrive it has been removed, assumingly by the clean up robots, and the room is empty. Derec theorizes it was pathogens in human blood (from a mundane cut on David's shoeless foot) that the Central Core was interpreting as an alien presence because of its lack of data on normal human blood borne pathogens. To test it, he cuts himself on the jagged edge of the hole in the wall and lets the blood drip on the floor. As expected, the wall responds and seals them in as it did David.

While they wait to be cut out, Katherine explains her real name is Ariel and she is the daughter of a wealthy family from Aurora. Her mother was funding the research of a Dr. Avery and this city is most likely his experiment.  Also, she has an incurable disease (contracted from a spacer) and was disowned by her family and banished from the planet.  She was searching for a cure when she met Derec in passing (she had earlier revealed to Derec his real name is David).  Later, she was captured by Aranimass.  No explanation is given to why she lied about her identity or kept this knowledge secret.

The robots arrive and begin cutting them out. Derec quickly realizes the cutting process is releasing the carbon monoxide in the building material and stops the cutting. He explains the murder wasn't really a murder and that David had died of carbon monoxide poisoning from being cut out when he was trapped.  Also, Katherine's headache was also caused by the carbon monoxide when the hole was cut for her to see the body. The robots realize this and agree Derec and Katherine, now Ariel, are innocent. Derec rushes off to tell the Central Core about pathogens to stop the out of control growth and, upset at her conversation with Derec, Ariel rushes to the Compass Tower to retrieve the Key.

As the rain starts falling, Ariel climbs down from the top to where Derec hid the Key only to find it gone. A robot climbs up from the bottom to protect her from falling and the rain by clamping itself to the structure around her. Meanwhile, Derec helps the robots figure out a way to divert that night's rain runoff so it won't destroy the city. The next morning he informs the Central Core about the pathogens and the city drops its security level, thus stopping the cycle of rain-causing dust and heat.  Ariel recovers from her night in the rain and tells Derec that the Key is missing. Without the Key, Derec and Ariel are stranded in Robot City with no hope of rescue.

External links 
 Isaac Asimov's Robot-Empire-Foundation Series Timeline
 

1987 novels
1987 science fiction novels